Francisco Lázaro (21 January 1888 – 15 July 1912) was a Portuguese Olympic marathon runner and Portugal's standard-bearer in their first-ever participation at the Olympic Games, the 1912 Summer Olympics in Stockholm, Sweden.

Like all the Olympic athletes of his time, Lázaro was an amateur sportsman, and his actual job was as a carpenter in an automobile factory in Lisbon. Prior to the Olympics, he had won three national marathon championships in Portugal, where he represented S.L. Benfica.

Lázaro was the first athlete to die during a modern Olympic event, after collapsing at the 30-kilometer mark (19 miles) of the marathon with a body temperature of 41 °C (105.8° F),  The cause of death was initially thought to be severe dehydration due to the high temperature registered at the time of the race. Later it was discovered that Lázaro had covered large portions of his body with suet to prevent sunburn and to help with speed and lightness while running; but eventually the wax restricted the athlete's natural perspiration, leading to a fatal body fluid electrolyte imbalance. Before the race, he had supposedly said: "Either I win or I die."

The following weekend, a memorial service for Lázaro was attended by 23,000 people at the Olympic Stadium. Approximately $US 3,800 was collected for his wife, and later a monument of Lázaro was placed at the marathon's turning point at Sollentuna, Stockholm. His name was given to a street in Lisbon and to the home stadium of football club C.F. Benfica. The novel The Piano Cemetery, by Portuguese novelist José Luís Peixoto, is based on Francisco Lázaro's story.

See also
 Olympic and Paralympic deaths

Media appearances
Lázaro appears briefly, and his death is noted, in the film The Games of the V Olympiad Stockholm, 1912.

References

1888 births
1912 deaths
Portuguese male marathon runners
Sport deaths in Sweden
Olympic athletes of Portugal
Athletes (track and field) at the 1912 Summer Olympics
Olympic deaths
S.L. Benfica athletes
Athletes from Lisbon
Sports competitors who died in competition
Carpenters